Kirill Vladimirovich Pokrovsky (Kирилл Владимирович Покровский; 25 March 19621 June 2015) was a Russian composer and musician.

Kirill Pokrovsky learned to play and compose music from a young age, before receiving classical training at Moscow Conservatory. Between 1985 and 1989, Pokrovsky played as a keyboardist for Soviet heavy metal music bands Aria and Master. Later he moved to Belgium and wrote his first solo album called BRUGGE.

Pokrovsky had a successful career as a video game score composer. He wrote the soundtrack for the Divinity series of video games produced by Larian Studios, up until Divinity: Original Sin, which he had finished work on prior to his death.

References

External links

Russian composers
Russian male composers
Belgian composers
Male composers
Belgian male musicians
1962 births
2015 deaths
Belgian people of Russian descent